Marcos Vinícius da Costa Soares da Silva (born 28 July 1991), known as Marcos Vinícius, is a Brazilian footballer who plays as a forward.

References

1991 births
Living people
People from Bauru
Brazilian footballers
Association football forwards
Campeonato Brasileiro Série D players
Marcos Vinicius
Brazilian expatriate sportspeople in Thailand
Expatriate footballers in Thailand
Bashundhara Kings players
Marcos Vinicius
Audax Rio de Janeiro Esporte Clube players
Marcos Vinicius
Atlético Monte Azul players
Clube Atlético Votuporanguense players
Associação Atlética Internacional (Limeira) players
Footballers from São Paulo (state)